The term Fiddleback may refer to:

Fiddleback chasuble, a Catholic liturgical vestment
Fiddleback spider, a colloquial name for the brown recluse spider
Fiddleback, a particular grain of maple wood used for musical instruments